Peter Thorne may refer to:

Peter Thorne (Australian footballer) (born 1960), Australian rules footballer and coach
Peter Thorne (climatologist), climatologist and professor of physical geography
Peter Thorne (English footballer) (born 1973), English football player
Peter Thorne (reporter), reporter and anchorman for WPIX-TV
Peter Thorne (RAF officer) (1923–2014), fighter pilot and test pilot